Samuel Frost may refer to:

 Samuel H. Frost (born 1818), New York state senator 1870–71
 Samuel Frost (pioneer)
 Samuel Frost (politician), New York state senator 1848–49
 Samuel Frost (murderer)

See also
 Sam Frost, Australian rules football player